The 2014–15 figure skating season began on July 1, 2014, and ended on June 30, 2015. During this season, elite skaters competed at the ISU Championship level in the 2015 European, Four Continents, World Junior, and World Championships. Other elite events included the Grand Prix series and Junior Grand Prix series, culminating in the Grand Prix Final, and the inaugural ISU Challenger Series.

Season notes 
Beginning in the 2014–15 season, the minimum age for senior Grand Prix and senior B events increased from 14 to 15 to match the minimum age for ISU Championship events. Another rule change allows single and pair skaters to use music with lyrics in competition. Previously, they were restricted to instrumental music, including vocals without words. The ISU Challenger Series, a series of senior internationals below the Grand Prix series, was introduced.

Age eligibility 
Skaters competing at the junior level were required to be at least 13 years of age before July 1, 2014. Those who turned 15 before that date were also eligible for all senior-level events.

Partnership changes 
Some skaters announced the dissolution of a partnership or formation of a new one. Listed are changes involving at least one partner who competed at Worlds, Europeans, Four Continents, Junior Worlds or the senior Grand Prix, or who medaled on the Junior Grand Prix circuit. The ISU does not permit teams to compete for two countries—if skaters of different nationalities team up, they must choose one country to represent.

Coaching changes

Retirements

Competitions 
Scheduled competitions:

Key

International medalists

Men

Ladies

Pairs

Ice dance

Season's best scores

Men 
Best total score

Best short program score

Best free skating score

Ladies 
Best total score

Best short program score

Best free skating score

Pairs 
Best total score

Best short program score

Best free skating score

Ice dance 
Best total score

Best short dance score

Best free dance score

Standings and ranking

Season-end standings (top 30)

Men's singles

Ladies' singles

Pairs

Ice dance

Season's ranking (top 30)

Men's singles

Ladies' singles

Pairs

Ice dance

References

External links 
 International Skating Union

Seasons in figure skating